Markíza (also known as Televízia Markíza) is a Slovak television channel launched on August 31, 1996. The channel was founded by a later politician Pavol Rusko, and is now part of the Central European Media Enterprises (CME). It also operates television channels Doma (since 2009), Dajto (since 2012), Markíza International (since 2016) and Markíza KRIMI (since 2022).

TV Markíza has built its programming strategy around family entertainment to reflect Slovakia's culture. Reaching more than 92% of Slovak households, TV Markíza is the clear leader on the national TV landscape.

Broadcasting 24 hours a day, TV Markíza is the flagship television channel encompassing all TV genres. Its program structure is composed of premium products such as Markíza's locally produced shows that are incredibly popular.

In addition to its high-quality news and local programs, TV Markíza has secured exclusive broadcast rights to a variety of popular American and European films and series produced by major international studios including Warner Bros., Sony Pictures, NBCUniversal, and ViacomCBS.

The Markíza Plus free video archive offers popular series and programs for a limited period of time after they are broadcast, as well as a wide range of exclusive bonus content. TV Markíza's attractive programming is also available through the most popular Slovak streaming service Voyo, mobile applications and HbbTV.

The General Director of CME's operations in the Slovakia is Matthias Settele.

Programming

Shows
 2 na 1 (2 vs. 1)
 Bez servítky (Celebrity Come Dine With Me)
 Dobre vedieť!(Who Knew?)
 Extrémne premeny Slovensko (Extreme Makeover Slovakia)
 Farma (Slovakia) (The Farm)
 Hlas Česko Slovenska / The Voice Česko Slovensko (The Voice of Czechia and Slovakia)
 Chart Show (Die Ultimative Chartshow)
Lego Masters
Let's Dance (Strictly Come Dancing)
Love Island
 MasterChef Česko Slovensko (MasterChef Czech & Slovak)
 MasterChef Slovensko (MasterChef Slovakia)
Milionár (Who Wants to Be a Millionaire?)
 
Na love (The Chase)
Na nože (Ramsay's Kitchen Nightmares)
Pestúnka (Supernanny)
Pokušenie (Jeopardy!)
SuperStar (Czech and Slovak Pop Idol)
Slovensko hľádá SuperStar (Slovak Pop Idol)
Slovensko má talent (Slovakia's got talent)
 Tvoja tvár znie povedome (Your Face Sounds Familiar)
 Utajený šéf (Undercover Boss)
 Zámena manželiek (Wife Swap)

Local series 

 Búrlivé víno (Taste of Love)
 Červené pásky (Red Band Society)
 Druhá šanca(DOC)
 Druhý dych (One Love)
 Horná Dolná(Middle of Nowhere)
 Horúca krv (Hot Blood)
 Chlapi neplačú (Blind Love)
 Medzi nami (Between us)
 Najhorší týždeň môjho života (The Worst Week of My Life)
 Ordinácia v ružovej záhrade (Rose Garden Clinic)
 Oteckovia (Dear Daddies)
 Pán profesor (The Teacher)
 Policajné prípady (Police Cases)
 Rodinné prípady (Family Affairs)
 Sestričky (Nurses)
 Susedia (Neighbours)
 Susedské prípady (Neighbour Affairs)
 Svätý Max (Sankt Maik)
 Šťastní vs. Šťastní (Ivanovy-Ivanovy)

Sport events 

 1998 IIHF World Championship
 1999 IIHF World Championship
 2000 IIHF World Championship
 2014 Winter Olympics (Men's ice hockey only)
 2016 World Cup of Hockey
 Formula One
 NHL
 UEFA Champions League
 UEFA Euro 2024
 UEFA Euro 2028

Television series

 
 Sestričky
  Oteckovia
  2 Broke Girls
 7th Heaven
 According to Jim
 Alarm für Cobra 11
 Ally McBeal
 
 Baywatch
 Beverly Hills, 90210
 Buffy the Vampire Slayer
 
 Close to Home
 Cold Case
 Hunter
 Columbo
 Criminal Minds
 Dallas
 Don Matteo
 Early Edition
 Everybody Hates Chris
 Felicity
 Flashpoint
 Frasier
 Friends
 Gossip Girl
 Gotham
 Hercules: The Legendary Journeys
 
 House
 Charmed
 Chicago Hope
 
 Inspector Rex
 Invasion
 JAG
 Joan of Arcadia
 Joey
 Kyle XY
 Married... with Children
 Medical Investigation
 M*A*S*H
 Melrose Place
 Mesto tieňov
 Mike & Molly
 Mission Hill
 Monk
 Mr. Bean
 Murder, She Wrote
 NCIS
 NCIS: Los Angeles
 NCIS: New Orleans
 Normálna rodinka
 NUMB3RS
 
 Parker Lewis Can't Lose
 Person of Interest
 
 Providence
 Revolution (TV series)
 Rex
 Rizzoli & Isles
 Sabrina, the Teenage Witch
 Smallville
 Space: Above and Beyond
 Step by Step
 Sue Thomas: F.B.Eye
 Summerland
 
 The Big Bang Theory
 The Bill Cosby Show
 The Mentalist
 The Naked Chef
 The O.C.
 The Vampire Diaries
 The War at Home
 The X-Files
 Tom Stone
 Two and a Half Men
 Veronica Mars
 
 World's Most Amazing Videos
  Telenovelas broadcast in past

 Amor real Binbir Gece Cabecita Cuando seas mia Daniela Destilando Amor El cuerpo del deseo El manantial El privilegio de amar Entre el amor y el odio Esmeralda Gitanas Inima de tigan La Madrastra La Tormenta La Venganza Laberintos de pasión Las Vías del Amor Maria de Nadie Mariana de la Noche Milady, la historia continúa Mujer Secreta Pasión De Gavilanes Perla Negra Rebeca Rosalinda Sos mi vida Te Voy a Enseñar a Querer Yago, pasión MorenaChildren series

 BoBoiBoy DuckTales Firehouse Tales Jackie Chan Adventures Maya the Honey Bee Oggy and the Cockroaches TaleSpin Tayo the Little Bus The Flintstones The Powerpuff Girls''

Periodical shows

Notable television presenters 

 Miroslava Almásy (2001–present)
 Lukáš Adamec (2016, 2020)
 Michal Arpáš (1996–1999)
 Erika Barkolová (1999–2007)
 Peter Batthyany (1996–1997)
 Andrej Bičan (2016–present)
 Kyla Cole (2003–2004)
 Peter Čambor (1999–2014)
 Daniel Dangl (2009–present)
 Jozef Dúbravský (2003–2006)
 Marianna Ďurianová (2001–2014)
 Michal Ďuriš (1996–2003)
 Ľudmila Farkašovská (2000–2003)
 Karol Farkašovský (2007–2012)
 Michal Farkašovský (2005–2008)
 Peter Gecík (2003–2005)
 Patrik Herman (1996–present)
 Jana Hospodárová (1996–present)
 Ivan Janda (1996–2003)
 Erika Judínyová (1998–2000, 2005–present)
 Miriam Kalisová (2007–present)
 Ľubomír Karásek (1999–2005)
 Mário Klein (1996–2002)
 Michal Kovačič (2008–present)
 Maroš Kramár (1996–present)
 Branislav Kríž (1997–2003)
 Jarmila Lajčáková-Hargašová (1996–2002)
 Milan Lasica (1996–1999)
 Iveta Malachovská (1996–2005)
 Gregor Mareš (2004–2008)
 Róbert Mikla (2005–2006)
 Juraj Mokrý (2001–2012)
 Danica Nejedlá (1998–present)
 Martin Nikodým (1996–2007, 2017–present)
 Daniela Nízlová (2002–2005)
 Veronika Nízlová (2002–2005)
 Branislav Ondruš (1996–1999)
 Aneta Parišková (1996–2006)
 Mária Pietrová (2002–2003, 2012–present)
 Magda Paveleková (1997–2001)
 Martin Rausch (2006–2018)
 Vladimír Repčík (1996–2006)
 Viliam Rozboril (1996–2014)
 Pavol Rusko (1996–2000)
 Július Satinský (1996–1999)
 Rastislav Sokol (2016–present)
 Martina Šimkovičová (1998–2015)
 Patrik Švajda (1997–present)
 Zlatica Švajdová-Puškárová (1999–present)
 Ján Tribula (1998–present)
 Elena Vacvalová (1998–2008)
 Andrea Vadkerti (1996–2001)
 Peter Varinský (2007–present)
 Lenka Vavrinčíková (2007–2021)
 Viktor Vincze (2013–present)
 Adela Vinczeová (1998–present)
 Jaroslav Zápala (2000–present)
 Rastislav Žitný (2005–2008)

CME Content Academy
In 2022 Markíza and TV Nova in cooperation with The Television Institute Brno, launched CME Content Academy. The scholarship program is funded by Central European Media Enterprises, to which both TV Nova and Markíza belong. Academy's two-year course is designed to provide participants with a grounding across various film-making disciplines, enabling students to become TV professionals.

The practice is divided according to the production scheme of TV Nova and Markíza and takes place in Brno, Prague and Bratislava.

References

External links

Central European Media Enterprises
Mass media in Slovakia
Television channels in Slovakia
Television channels and stations established in 1996